The Da Nang Tennis Open was a professional tennis tournament played on hard courts. It was part of the ATP Challenger Tour. It was held in Da Nang, Vietnam in 2019.

Past finals

Singles

Doubles

References

ATP Challenger Tour
Hard court tennis tournaments
Tennis tournaments in Vietnam
Da Nang